Rivomanantsoa Andriamaonju (born 15 May 1963) is a French volleyball player. He competed in the men's tournament at the 1992 Summer Olympics.

References

1963 births
Living people
French men's volleyball players
Olympic volleyball players of France
Volleyball players at the 1992 Summer Olympics
People from Antananarivo